Elena Bovina and Justine Henin-Hardenne were the defending champions but none competed this year, as both players decided to priorize the singles competition.

Kim Clijsters and Ai Sugiyama won the title by defeating Virginia Ruano Pascual and Paola Suárez 7–6(7–3), 6–2 in the final.

Seeds

Draw

Draw

Qualifiers

Qualifying seeds

Qualifiers
  Sonya Jeyaseelan /  Tamarine Tanasugarn

Qualifying draw

References

External links
 Official results archive (ITF)
 Official results archive (WTA)

2003 Doubles
Swisscom Challenge - Doubles